Owyhee Airport  is a public use airport located  west of the central business district of Owyhee, in Elko County, Nevada, United States. It is owned by the Shoshone-Paiute Tribes and is located within the Duck Valley Indian Reservation.

The National Plan of Integrated Airport Systems for 2011–2015 categorized it as a general aviation facility.

History
The airport was built by the United States Army Air Forces about 1942, and was known as Owyhee Flight Strip.  It was an emergency landing airfield for military aircraft on training flights.  It was closed after World War II, and was turned over for local government use by the War Assets Administration (WAA).

Facilities and aircraft 
For the 12-month period ending June 30, 2012, the airport had 50 general aviation aircraft operations, an average of 4 per month.

References

External links 
  from Nevada DOT
 Aerial image as of June 1994 from USGS The National Map
 

Airports in Nevada
Transportation in Elko County, Nevada
Buildings and structures in Elko County, Nevada
Airports established in 1942
Airfields of the United States Army Air Forces in Nevada
Flight Strips of the United States Army Air Forces
Native American airports
Shoshone
Paiute
1942 establishments in Nevada